Shadows of Glory (Spanish:Sombras de gloria) is a pre-Code Spanish-language American film released in 1930. It was produced by Sono Art-World Wide Pictures to serve as an alternate-language version of their English-language release Blaze o' Glory (1929). It was the first foreign-language sound film produced in the United States.

Plot
Sombras de gloria, like Blaze o' Glory, takes its premise from the story The Long Shot by Thomas Alexander Boyd. It is part war movie, part courtroom drama.

Cast
 Jose Bohr as Eddie Williams
 Mona Rico as Helen Williams
 Francisco Maran as Dr. Castelli
 Cesar Vanoni as District Attorney
 Demetrius Alexis as Carl Hummel
 Juan Torena as Jack
 Enrique Acosta as Judge

Production and distribution
According to modern web sources, Sombras de gloria was shot at Metropolitan Studios in Hollywood in October 1929. The premiere took place at the studio on January 25, 1930. The film opened to the general public in the United States five days later. It is not presently available in DVD.

References

External links
 
 

1930 films
1930s legal films
1930s war films
American black-and-white films
American legal films
American war films
1930s Spanish-language films
Spanish-language American films
Western Front (World War I) films
Films directed by Andrew L. Stone
1930s American films